The men's kumite +75 kilograms competition at the 2002 Asian Games in Busan was held on 11 October at the Yangsan College Gymnasium.

Schedule
All times are Korea Standard Time (UTC+09:00)

Results
Legend
WO — Won by walkover

Main bracket

Repechage

References

2002 Asian Games Report, Page 481

External links
Official website

Men's kumite 76 kg